This list comprises all players who have participated in at least one league match for Chivas USA since the team's first Major League Soccer season in 2005, until its last in 2014. Players who were on the roster but never played a first team game are not listed; players who appeared for the team in other competitions (U.S. Open Cup, CONCACAF Champions League, etc.) but never actually made an MLS appearance are noted at the bottom of the page.

A "†" denotes players who only appeared in a single match.

A
  Juan Agudelo
  Carlos Alvarez
  Juan Pablo Ángel
  Daniel Antúnez
  Esteban Arias
  Eric Avila

B
  Leandro Barrera
  Adolfo Bautista
  Armando Begines
  Milton Blanco
  Carlos Bocanegra
  Luis Bolaños
  Miller Bolaños
  Carlos Borja
  Félix Borja
  Jonathan Bornstein
  Tristan Bowen
  Andrew Boyens
  Justin Braun
  Bobby Burling
  Preston Burpo

C
  Danny Califf
  Paolo Cardozo
  Giovani Casillas
  Marvin Chávez
  Chukwudi Chijindu
  Kraig Chiles
  Carlo Chueca
  Jimmy Conrad
  Rene Corona †
  José Erick Correa
  Chris Cortez
  Laurent Courtois
  Héctor Cuadros
  Yamith Cuesta
  John Cunliffe
  Jim Curtin

D
  Bryan de la Fuente 
  Mario de Luna
  Dejair
  Darío Delgado
  Marco Delgado
  Matt Dunn

E
  Eric Ebert
  Simon Elliott
  Alecko Eskandarian
  Rodolfo Espinoza
  Víctor Estupiñán

F
  Gabriel Farfan
  Ryan Finley
  Matthew Fondy
  Daniel Fragoso
  Jaime Frías

G
  Maykel Galindo
  Johnny García
  Juan Pablo García
  Sergio García
  Blair Gavin
  Francisco Gomez
  Alan Gordon
  Scott Gordon
  Amado Guevara
  Kevin Guppy †
  Brad Guzan

H
  Anthony Hamilton
  Atiba Harris
  Drew Helm
  Ezra Hendrickson
  Jason Hernandez
  Jhon Kennedy Hurtado

I
  Marvin Iraheta

J
  Ante Jazić
  Andrew Jean-Baptiste
  Shalrie Joseph

K
  Akira Kaji
  Dan Kennedy
  Sacha Kljestan

L
  Nick LaBrocca
  Michael Lahoud
  Eduardo Lillingston
  Carlos Llamosa
  Tony Lochhead
  Alfonso Loera
  David Lopes
  Aaron López
  Rodrigo López

M
  José Macotelo
  Giancarlo Maldonado
  Jesse Marsch
  Antonio Martínez
  Thiago Martins
  Gerson Mayen
  Rauwshan McKenzie
  Patrick McLain
  Thomas McNamara
  Edgar Mejía
  Tim Melia
  Francisco Mendoza
  Laurent Merlin
  Oswaldo Minda
  Marcos Mondaini
  Luke Moore
  Jesús Morales
  Julio Morales
  Alejandro Moreno
  Mike Munoz †

N
  Paulo Nagamura
  Ramón Núñez
  Roberto Nurse

O
  John O'Brien †
  Jesús Ochoa

P
  Jesús Padilla
  Daniel Paladini
  Francisco Palencia
  Lance Parker
  Heath Pearce
  Agustín Pelletieri
  Orlando Perez
  Martín Ponce
  Chris Pozniak
  Steve Purdy

R
  Ramón Ramírez
  Ante Razov
  Tim Regan
  Nigel Reo-Coker
  James Riley
  José Manuel Rivera
  Martín Rivero
  Cesar Romero
  Osael Romero
  Isaac Romo
  Mauro Rosales

S
  Maicon Santos
  Marcelo Saragosa
  Keith Savage
  Douglas Sequeira
  Ryan Smith
  Erasmo Solórzano †
  Josue Soto
  Trevor Spangenberg †
  Bojan Stepanović
  Nathan Sturgis
  Claudio Suárez
  Ryan Suarez

T
  Carey Talley
  Matt Taylor
  Shavar Thomas
  Zach Thornton
  Donny Toia
  Arturo Torres
  Erick Torres
  Casey Townsend
  Mariano Trujillo
  Kris Tyrpak

U
  Michael Umaña

V
  Peter Vagenas
  John Alexander Valencia
  Zarek Valentin
  Lawson Vaughn
  Joaquín Velázquez
  Sasha Victorine
  Walter Vílchez
  Jorge Villafaña

W
  Brent Whitfield
  Raphaël Wicky

Z
  Eriq Zavaleta
  Ben Zemanski
  Sal Zizzo
  Alex Zotincă
  Martín Zúñiga

Sources
 

C.D. Chivas USA
 
Association football player non-biographical articles